Maggie Civantos (born 28 December 1984) is a Spanish actress, best known for her starring role of Macarena Ferreiro in the prison series Locked Up (Vis a vis). She has since starred in series such as Cable Girls, Malaka, Vis a vis: El oasis or Express.

Biography
Born in Málaga on 28 December 1984, her mother is a singer and her father is a sound technician. She was named after the character Maggie Gioberti, played by Susan Sullivan, in the TV series Falcon Crest.

Career
She began her career in Escenas de matrimonio replacing Mar Saura, Hospital central and Yo soy Bea. In 2008 she starred the TV series Eva y kolegas by Antena 3. She played Angélica in the Canal Sur Televisión TV series Arrayán.

In 2014 she had her first important role as Fanny in Bienvenidos al Lolita. Her biggest role was as Macarena, the main character in the 2015 TV series Vis a vis. In 2017 she appeared in the first Spanish Netflix original series Cable Girls (Las chicas del cable) alongside Blanca Suárez, Ana Fernández and Nadia de Santiago.

She returned as Macarena in the spin-off Vis a vis: El oasis, starring with Najwa Nimri. She appears along Salva Reina in Malaka.

Filmography

Films

Television series

Awards and nominations 
{| class="wikitable sortable plainrowheaders"
! Year
! Award
! Category
! Work
! Result
! scope="col" class="unsortable"| 
|-
| align = "center" | 2015 || 3rd  || Best Drama Actress || rowspan = "4" | Locked Up ||  || align = "center" | 
|-
| align = "center" | 2016 || 25th Actors and Actresses Union Awards || Best Television Actress in a Leading Role ||  || align = "center" | 
|-
| align = "center" | 2017 || 4th Feroz Awards || Best Leading Actress in a Television Series ||  || align = "center" | 
|-
| align = "center" | 2017 || 26th Actors and Actresses Union Awards || Best Television Actress in a Leading Role ||  || align = "center" | 
|-
| align = "center" | 2021 || 71st Fotogramas de Plata || Best Television Actress || Vis a vis: El Oasis ||  || align = "center" |

References

External links
 
 
 
 

21st-century Spanish actresses
Living people
1984 births
People from Málaga